Dicranella may refer to:
 Dicranella (plant), a plant genus in the family Dicranaceae
 Dicranella (crustacean), a fossil ostracod genus in the family Tvaerenellidae